Lateral plantar may refer to:

 Lateral plantar nerve
 Lateral plantar artery